LaGrone or La Grone is a surname. Notable people with the surname include:

Andrew La Grone (born 1990), American politician
Edward Lagrone (1957–2004), American serial killer
John LaGrone (born 1944), Canadian football player
Oliver LaGrone (1906–1995), African-American sculptor, poet, educator, and humanitarian
Roy LaGrone (born 1966), American digital media artist